Origi is the surname of three related footballers:

 Mike Origi (born 1967), played for Kenya and various Belgian clubs
 Arnold Origi (born 1983), plays for Kenya and Lillestrøm, has played for various Kenyan and Norwegian clubs
 Divock Origi (born 1995), plays for Belgium and AC Milan